Rhythm Garden is a Home Ownership Scheme and Private Sector Participation Scheme court in San Po Kong, Wong Tai Sin District, Kowloon, Hong Kong, jointly developed by the Hong Kong Housing Authority and New World Development. Formerly a part of the site of former British Forces Overseas Hong Kong's Blackdown Barracks, the court has 12 blocks completed in 2000.

Houses

References

Home Ownership Scheme
Private Sector Participation Scheme
San Po Kong
Residential buildings completed in 2000
New World Development
Sa Tei Yuen